Span Air is an Indian charter airline based in New Delhi.

History
The airline started operations in 1995 and currently operates to domestic destinations within the country. In 2014 the airline's Hawker 900XP aircraft was grounded due to safety violations concerning crew training. In the same year the company was one of the recipients of the American Helicopter Society's  Captain William J. Kossler Award for its part in rescue and humanitarian operations during the 2013 flooding in Uttarakhand.

Fleet
Span Air operates the following aircraft as of July 2018:

References

Airlines of India
Airlines established in 1985
1985 establishments in Delhi
Indian companies established in 1985